Otto Horber (7 May 1912 – 14 March 2003) was a Swiss sports shooter. He competed at the 1948 Summer Olympics and 1952 Summer Olympics.

References

1912 births
2003 deaths
Swiss male sport shooters
Olympic shooters of Switzerland
Shooters at the 1948 Summer Olympics
Shooters at the 1952 Summer Olympics
Place of birth missing